Discopus is a genus of beetles in the family Cerambycidae, containing the following species:

 Discopus antennatus (Guérin-Méneville, 1855)
 Discopus buckleyi Bates, 1880
 Discopus comes Bates, 1880
 Discopus eques Bates, 1880
 Discopus patricius Bates, 1880
 Discopus princeps Bates, 1880
 Discopus spectabilis (Bates, 1861)

References

Acanthoderini